Bilateral relations have been established between the Co-operative Republic of Guyana and the United States of America.

History

U.S. policy toward Guyana seeks to develop robust, sustainable democratic institutions, laws, and political practices; support economic growth and development; and promote stability and security. During the last years of his administration, President Hoyte sought to improve relations with the United States as part of a decision to move his country toward genuine political nonalignment. Relations also were improved by Hoyte's efforts to respect human rights, invite international observers for the 1992 elections, and reform electoral laws. The United States also welcomed the Hoyte government's economic reform and efforts, which stimulated investment and growth. The 1992 democratic elections and Guyana's reaffirmation of sound economic policies and respect for human rights have benefited U.S.-Guyanese relations. Under successive PPP governments, the United States and Guyana continued to improve relations. President Cheddi Jagan was committed to democracy, adopted more free market policies, and pursued sustainable development for Guyana's environment. President Jagdeo is continuing on that course, and the United States maintains positive relations with the current government.

In an effort to combat the spread of HIV/AIDS in The Co-operative Republic of Guyana, the U.S. Centers for Disease Control and Prevention (CDC) opened an office at the U.S. Embassy in 2002. In January 2003, The Cooperative Republic of Guyana was named as one of only two countries in the Western Hemisphere to be included in President Bush's Emergency Plan for AIDS Relief. CDC, in coordination with the U.S. Agency for International Development (USAID), is administering a 5-year multimillion-dollar program of education, prevention, and treatment for those infected and affected by the disease. The Cooperative Republic of Guyana was a threshold country in the Millennium Challenge Account developmental program.

U.S. military medical and engineering teams continue to conduct training exercises in Guyana, digging wells, building schools and clinics, and providing medical treatment.

In September 2020, in a joint statement with the U.S. Secretary of State Mike Pompeo, President Irfaan Ali said the two countries would begin joint maritime patrols aimed at drug interdiction near Guyana's disputed border with crisis-stricken Venezuela. The agreement came as U.S. oil major Exxon Mobil Corp, as part of a consortium with Hess Corp, ramped up crude output from Guyana's massive offshore Stabroek block, a large portion of which is in waters claimed by Venezuela. Pompeo and Ali added that "greater security, greater capacity to understand your border space, what's happening inside your Exclusive Economic Zone - those are all things that give Guyana sovereignty."

Political activism inside Guyana
There is an active political party along a civil movement in Guyana that advocates deeper ties between the United States and Guyana, seeking to become a U.S. territory or entering its Commonwealth similar to Puerto Rico. Even  possible statehood has been formulated as an ultimate goal. Citing among many other factors the Guyanese emigration to the U.S. and the close ties that have emerged from it socially and economically an official internet presence was established and has been in operation for several years providing detailed information regarding emigration and other facts concerning the current Guyanese state.

U.S. embassy officials
Principal U.S. Embassy Officials include:
 Ambassador - Sarah-Ann Lynch
 Deputy Chief of Mission: Terry Steers-Gonzalez
 Management Officer: James Grounds
 Political/Econ Chief: D. James Bjorkman
 Public Affairs Officer:  Amanda Cauldwell
 Chief, Consular Affairs: Nazima Razick
 Regional Security Officer: William Noone
 HHS/CDC Country Director: Rachal Albalak
 Military Liaison Office Commander:  LCDR. Michael A. White
 Peace Corps Country Director: Linda Arbogast
 USAID Country Director: Christopher Cushing

Diplomatic missions
The U.S. Embassy in Guyana is located in Georgetown.

See also

 Union of South American Nations
 Free Trade Area of the Americas
 Third Border Initiative
 Caribbean Community
 Caribbean Basin Initiative (CBI)
 Caribbean Basin Trade Partnership Act
 Western Hemisphere Travel Initiative
 Foreign relations of the United States
 Foreign relations of Guyana
 Jonestown
 Leo Ryan

References

Further reading
 Lamur, Carlo. The American Takeover: Industrial Emergence and Alcoa's Expansion in Guyana and Surinam 1914-1921 (Brill, 1983).
 McLeod, Jacqueline A.  "Guyanese Americans." Gale Encyclopedia of Multicultural America, edited by Thomas Riggs, (3rd ed., vol. 2, Gale, 2014), pp. 293–303. online
 Rose, Euclid A. Dependency and Socialism in the Modern Caribbean: Superpower Intervention in Guyana, Jamaica, and Grenada, 1970-1985 (Lexington Books, 2002).

External links
 History of Guyana - U.S. relations
 The United States Department of State – The Cooperative Republic of Guyana
 The Embassy of the United States of America

 
Bilateral relations of the United States
United States